The Victorian Bar is the bar association of the Australian State of Victoria. The 2022-2023 President of the Bar is Sam Hay KC. Its members are barristers registered to practice in Victoria. Those who have been admitted to practice by the Supreme Court of Victoria are eligible to join the Victorian Bar after sitting an entrance exam and completing a Bar readers' course. The Victorian Central Bar is affiliated with the Australian Bar Association and is a member of the Law Council of Australia.

The first association of barristers in Victoria was formed in 1884, although the first barristers admitted to practice in Victoria were appointed in 1841. On 20 June 1900, an official Bar Council was established and a Bar Roll was started. By 1902, all barristers practicing in Melbourne had signed the Roll. To this day, new barristers sign the Roll when they are admitted to the Bar.

As of June 2019, 30% of barristers at the Victorian Bar were women, and women made up 43% of those with less than 10 years of practising at the Bar. In 2019, 15% of members were born outside of Australia and 18 languages other than English were spoken at home. Six women have served as Chairs or Presidents of the Bar, including 2021-2022 President, Roisin Annesley KC, as well as, Susan Crennan AC KC, Kate McMillan SC (now the Honourable Justice McMillian), Melanie Sloss SC (now the Honourable Justice Sloss), Fiona McLeod SC, Jennifer Batrouney KC, and Wendy Harris KC.

Pro Bono Scheme 
In 2000, the Victorian Bar launched a Legal Assistance Scheme in association with the Public Interest Law Clearing House, to coordinate pro bono work among barristers in Victoria. The Legal Assistance Scheme, now operating as the "Pro Bono Scheme" (the Scheme) and PILCH, now operating as  "Justice Connect", has approximately 10,000 participants from the Victorian Bar.

Overseen by the Pro Bono Committee, the Scheme assists both individuals and community groups with legal aid. This work includes advocating for human rights, environmental or social justice causes, and helping people who are marginalized or from disadvantaged backgrounds. The premise of the Scheme is to ensure that everyone has access to legal representation regardless of age, gender, race, disability or socio-economic hardship.

Equitable Briefing 
In 2016, the Victorian Bar endorsed the National Model Gender Equitable Briefing Policy, launched by the Law Council of Australia to achieve a nationally consistent approach towards bringing about cultural and attitudinal change within the legal profession concerning gender briefing practices. The Victorian Bar has also adopted the Law Council’s Diversity and Equality Charter. The Commercial Bar Association of Victoria, members of the Judiciary and the Victorian Equal Opportunity and Human Rights Commission have also launched the CommBar Equitable Briefing Initiative to increase briefing of women at all levels and to engage with the law firms that brief the Commercial Bar to commit to real change. 

In 2018/19, the Bar Council established three new working groups to broaden the conversation about diversity at the Bar to include LGBT, disability and accessibility, and race, ethnicity and cultural diversity.

International legal practitioners 
All lawyers in Australia must first be admitted to practice. In Victoria, the process for admission is conducted by the Victorian Legal Board of Admissions (VLAB).

Chairman and Presidents of the Victorian Bar

See also 
 Bar council
 Bar association
 Australian Bar Association

References

External links
 http://www.vicbar.com.au/ - the Victorian Bar's website
 http://www.commbar.com.au/ - Commercial Bar Association of Victoria website

Legal organisations based in Australia
Bar associations
Organizations established in 1900
Victoria (Australia) law
Organisations based in Victoria (Australia)
1900 establishments in Australia